is a railway station on the Keio Inokashira Line in Suginami, Tokyo, Japan, operated by the private railway operator Keio Corporation.

Lines

Service pattern
Only all-stations "Local" services stop at this station. During the daytime, there are eight services per hour in either direction.

Station layout

The station consists of a ground-level island platform serving two tracks.

Previously there was only one ticket gate, at the south exit, and the platform and station building were connected by an underground passageway. In order to make it accessible, and to prevent traffic accidents at the railroad crossing outside the station, it was decided that it would be rebuilt as an over-track station with a north exit, elevators and escalators. It was also decided to add a free passageway over the tracks as well as elevators and an escalator on the north end, and construction began in October 2007, with the new station building opening on 16 December of the same year. On 25 March 2008, the new south exit, with elevators, escalators and stairs opened. Because of space constraints, on the north side there is only an upward escalator.

Before the renovations, there were no toilets within the station, and the Suginami public toilet in the square outside the station was used. With the new over-track station building, however, toilets were built inside the ticket gates, including a multipurpose toilet. After the station's renovations were completed, the public toilet outside the station was rebuilt. The shops outside the south exit were closed before the renovation.

The station is only 700 m from neighboring Eifukucho Station, and both Eifukuchō Station and Hamadayama Station can be seen from the platform.

Platforms

History
The station opened on 1 August 1933.

From 22 February 2013, station numbering was introduced on Keio lines, with Nishi-eifuku Station becoming "IN10".

Passenger statistics
In fiscal 2011, the station was used by an average of 18,087 passengers daily.

The passenger figures for previous years are as shown below.

Surrounding area
 Takachiho University

References

External links

 Nishi-eifuku Station information (Keio) 

Railway stations in Japan opened in 1933
Railway stations in Tokyo